Chloropinae is a subfamily of grass flies in the family Chloropidae.

Genera
These 76 genera belong to the subfamily Chloropinae:

 Anathracophaga
 Anthracophagella Anderson, 1977 c g
 Aragara Walker, 1860 c g
 Archimeromyza Deeming, 1981 c g
 Assuania Becker, 1903 c g
 Bathyparia Lamb, 1917 c g
 Bothynocerus Paganelli, 2002
 Bricelochlorops Paganelli 2002 g
 Camarota Meigen, 1830 c g
 Capnoptera Loew, 1866 c g
 Centorisoma Becker, 1910 c g
 Cerais Wulp, 1881 c g
 Cetema Hendel, 1907 i c g b
 Chloromerus Becker, 1911 c g
 Chloropella Malloch, 1925 c g
 Chlorops Meigen, 1803 i g b
 Chloropsina Becker, 1911 i c g
 Chromatopterum Becker, 1910 c g
 Collessimyia Spencer, 1986 c g
 Coniochlorops Duda, 1934 c g
 Cordylosomides Strand, 1928 c g
 Coroichlorops Paganelli, 2002 g
 Cryptonevra Lioy, 1864 c g
 Desertochlorops Narchuk, 1966 c g
 Diplotoxa Loew, 1863 i c g b
 Dudeurina Ismay, 1995
 Ectecephala Macquart, 1851 i c g b
 Ectecephalina Paganelli, 2002
 Elachiptereicus Becker, 1909 c g
 Elliponeura Loew, 1869 i c g
 Ensiferella Andersson, 1977 c g
 Epichlorops Becker, 1910 i c g b
 Eurina Meigen, 1830 c g
 Eutropha Loew, 1855 c g
 Homalura Meigen, 1826 c g
 Homaluroides Sabrosky, 1980 i c g b
 Homops Speiser, 1923 c g
 Ischnochlorops Paganelli, 2002 g
 Lagaroceras Becker, 1903 c g
 Lasiosina Becker, 1910 i c g b
 Lieparella Spencer, 1986 c g
 Luzonia Frey, 1923
 Melanum Becker, 1910 c g
 Mepachymerus (Steleocerellus) c g
 Merochlorops Hewlett, 1909 c g
 Meromyza Meigen, 1830 i c g b
 Meromyzella Andersson, 1977 c g
 Metopostigma Becker, 1903 c g
 Neodiplotoxa Malloch, 1914 i c g b
 Neohaplegis Beschovski, 1981a
 Neoloxotaenia Sabrosky i c g
 Pachylophus Loew, 1858 c g
 Paracamarota Cherian, 1991 c g
 Paraeurina Duda, 1933 c g
 Parectecephala Becker, 1910 i c g b
 Pemphigonotus Lamb, 1917 c g
 Phyladelphus Becker, 1910 c g
 Platycephala Fallén, 1820 g
 Platycephalisca Nartshuk, 1959 c g
 Pseudochromatopterum Deeming, 1981 c g
 Pseudopachychaeta Strobl, 1902 i c g b
 Pseudothaumatomyia Narchuk, 1963 c g
 Psilochlorops Duda, 1930 c g
 Sagarocerus Paganelli, 2002
 Semaranga Becker i c g
 Sineurina Yang & Yang, 1992
 Siphlus Loew, 1858 c g
 Steleocerellus Frey, 1961 c g
 Stenophthalmus Becker, 1903 c g
 Terusa Kanmiya, 1983 c
 Thaumatomyia Zenker, 1833 i c g b
 Thressa Walker, 1860 c g
 Trichieurina Duda c g
 Trigonomma Enderlein, 1911 i c g
 Urubambina Paganelli, 2002
 Xena Nartshuk, 1964 c g

Data sources: i = ITIS, c = Catalogue of Life, g = GBIF, b = Bugguide.net

References

Further reading

External links

 
 

 
Brachycera subfamilies